Evil Ambitions (also known as Satanic Yuppies) is a 1996 horror film directed by Mark Burchett. The film stars Paul Morris, Amber Newman, David Levy, Lucy Frashure, Renae Raos, Debbie Rochon and S. William Hinzman. The plot revolves around a public relations firm that is secretly a front for Devil worship. Young female models are kidnapped and sacrificed to Satan.

External links 
.

1996 horror films
1996 films
1990s English-language films